Nicholas Sickles (September 11, 1801 – May 13, 1845) was an American attorney and politician in the U.S. state of New York. From 1835 to 1837, he represented New York in the United States House of Representatives for one term.

Biography
Sickles was born in Kinderhook, New York. He attended private schools and Kinderhook Academy before studying law. He was admitted to the bar in 1823 and commenced practice in Kingston, New York.

Congress 
He was elected as a Jacksonian candidate to the Twenty-fourth Congress, serving from December 7, 1835 to March 3, 1837. After leaving Congress, he served as prosecuting attorney of Ulster County, New York in 1836 and 1837. Sickles served as surrogate of Ulster County from January 1, 1844 until his death in Kingston, New York on May 13, 1845. He is interred in Houghtaling Burying Ground in Kingston.

Notes

External links 

 

	

1801 births
1845 deaths
People from Kinderhook, New York
Politicians from Kingston, New York
New York (state) lawyers
County district attorneys in New York (state)
Jacksonian members of the United States House of Representatives from New York (state)
19th-century American politicians
Members of the United States House of Representatives from New York (state)